Hensley Township may refer to the following townships in the United States:

 Hensley Township, Champaign County, Illinois
 Hensley Township, Johnson County, Indiana